Paavo Klaus Emil Jännes (formerly Genetz, 20 March 1892 − 19 December 1970) was a Finnish theatre and film actor. He appeared in over 70 films between 1913−1969.

Selected filmography 
Sylvi (1913)
Miehen kylkiluu (1937)
Dynamiittityttö (1944)
Kolmastoista koputus (1945)
Linnaisten vihreä kamari (1945)
"Minä elän" (1946)
Golden Light (1946)
Radio tekee murron (1951)
Jealousy (1953)
Ryysyrannan Jooseppi (1955)
Risti ja liekki (1957)
Pikku Pietarin piha (1961)
Ruusujen aika (1969)

References

External links 
 

1892 births
1970 deaths
Finnish male film actors
Male actors from Helsinki